Hugh Patrick Murney (born 29 January 1939) was a Scottish footballer who played for Morton, Dumbarton, Queen of the South, Gloucester City and East Stirling.

Later, Murney would continue his playing career with Melbourne Hakoah in the Victorian State League, before taking up coaching.

References

1939 births
Scottish footballers
Greenock Morton F.C. players
Dumbarton F.C. players
Queen of the South F.C. players
Gloucester City A.F.C. players
East Stirlingshire F.C. players
Scottish Football League players
Association football midfielders
Living people